Jeff Porter is an American businessman and politician from the state of Missouri. A Republican, Porter was elected to the Missouri House of Representatives from the 42nd District in 2018. Having succeeded Bart Korman, who was term limited, he represents Montgomery County and adjacent portions of Warren and Saint Charles counties. Porter was previously the mayor of Montgomery City for 15 years. He is also a local insurance and real estate agent.

Election results

References

21st-century American politicians
Living people
Republican Party members of the Missouri House of Representatives
People from Montgomery City, Missouri
University of Missouri alumni
Year of birth missing (living people)